Thomas Luttgen Walker (November 8, 1922,  Milwaukee, Wisconsin – October 20, 1986) was an American producer of live entertainment events who was director of entertainment at Disneyland during its first twelve years of operation, and later produced events at celebrations including three Olympic Games and the centennial of the Statue of Liberty. He was the composer of the six-note "Charge!" fanfare.

References
 "Tommy Walker, 63, Producer Of Fireworks Displays, Dies" New York Times (Oct 25, 1986)
"From the Olympics to Harvard" – 1986 Harvard Crimson article on the university's 350th anniversary celebration
"Give him credit for the charge: Tommy Walker converted six notes into a famous fanfare." Sports Illustrated 73.n20 (Nov 12, 1990): 5A (2) 
 "He Made the Music — Now She Wants Disney to Face It" Dana Parsons, Los Angeles Times (Apr 10, 1996): B1, B6

Festival directors
1922 births
1986 deaths
University of Southern California alumni